This is a list of finalists for the 2018 Archibald Prize for portraiture, listed is Artist – Title. (As the images are copyright, an external link to an image has been listed where available.)

 Benjamin Aitken – Natasha (Portrait of Natasha Bieniek – Image)
 Del Kathryn Barton – Self-portrait with studio wife
 Jason Benjamin – So you want to come down and the silence of painting (self-portrait)
 Peter Berner – Self-portrait with hindsight
 Amber Boardman – Self-care exhaustion
 Joanna Braithwaite – Hall of fame – portrait of Pat Corrigan
 Jun Chen – Judith Bell
 Yvette Coppersmith – Self-portrait, after George Lambert Winner: Archibald Prize 2018
 Tony Costa – Claudia Chan Shaw
 Jonathan Dalton – Abdul
 David Darcy – Charlotte
 Amanda Davies – Self-portrait
 Blak Douglas – Uncle Roy Kennedy
 Graeme Drendel – Portrait of Michel
 Yvonne East – The Honourable Chief Justice Susan Kiefel AC
 Marc Etherington – Me and Granny
 Marina Finlay – Peter, Coco and Susan O'Doherty
 Prudence Flint – Double
 Andrew Lloyd Greensmith – The serenity of Susan Carland
 David Griggs – The warrior and the prophet
 Melissa Grisancich – Courtney Barnett and her weapon of choice
 Robert Hannaford – Robert Hannaford self-portrait
 Tsering Hannaford – Self-portrait
 Nicholas Harding – Treatment, day 49 (sorbolene soak)
 Amani Haydar – Insert headline here
 Pei Pei He – Portrait of Theodore Wohng
 Paul Jackson – Alison Whyte, a mother of the renaissance
 Kathrin Longhurst – Self: past, present and future
 Mathew Lynn – Gladys Berejiklian
 Alison Mackay – Quid pro quo (portrait of photographer Gary Grealy)
 William Mackinnon – The long apprenticeship
 Euan Macleod – Guy at Jamberoo
 Guy Maestri – The fourth week of parenthood (self-portrait)
 Robert Malherbe – Michael Reid
 India Mark – Candy
 Fiona McMonagle – Sangeeta Sandrasegar
 Julian Meagher – Herb and Flan
 Anne Middleton – Guy (Winner: People's Choice Award 2018) 
 Stephanie Monteith – The letter – I really wanted to paint Germaine Greer, but she said 'no' (self-portrait)
 Vincent Namatjira – Studio self-portrait
 Kirsty Neilson – Anxiety still at 30
 Tom Polo – I once thought I'd do anything for you (Joan)
 James Powditch – Narcissist, the anatomy of melancholy
 Jamie Preisz – Jimmy (title fight) Winner: Packing Room Prize 2018
 Jordan Richardson – David Wenham and hat
 Sally Ross – The Huxleys
 Dee Smart – Lunch in the outback
 Ben Smith – Tony
 Loribelle Spirovski – Villains always get the best lines
 Vanessa Stockard – Self-portrait
 Noel Thurgate – Elisabeth Cummings in her studio at Wedderburn, 1974 and 2018
 Angela Tiatia – Study for a self-portrait
 Natasha Walsh – Numb to touch (self-portrait)
 Mirra Whale – Don
 Marcus Wills – Lotte (Portrait of Lotte St Clair)
 Karyn Zamel – Marina Finlay
 Salvatore Zofrea – Sally Dowling SC

See also 
Previous year: List of Archibald Prize 2017 finalists
Next year: List of Archibald Prize 2019 finalists
List of Archibald Prize winners

References

2018
Archibald
Archibald
Archibald Prize 2018
Archibald Prize 2018
Archibald